La casa de las sombras (English: House of Shadows) is a 1976 Argentinian mystery thriller film starring Yvonne De Carlo, John Gavin, Leonor Manso and Mecha Ortiz.

Plot
As Audrey walks alone on a stormy night, she hears a woman's voice pleading for mercy. She enters an old deserted mansion only to witness a gruesome murder. The police are summoned, but when they arrive, the body is gone. Audrey, intent on the truth of her vision, sets out to find the body and the murderer. She begins to investigate the murdered woman's past life and the days preceding her death, only to find that the murder happened 23 years ago.

Cast
Yvonne De Carlo as Mrs. Howard
John Gavin as Roland Stewart
Leonor Manso as Audrey Christiansen / Catherine Webster
Mecha Ortiz as Mrs. Randall

External links

1976 films
1970s mystery thriller films
English-language Argentine films
Argentine mystery thriller films
1970s English-language films
1970s Argentine films